The Banjhakri Falls and Energy Park is a recreation centre and tourist attraction near Gangtok, in the state of Sikkim, India. The park's statuary and other displays document the Ban Jhakri, or traditional shamanic healer who worships spirits living in caves around the falls. Ban means "forest", and jhākri means "healer".

Layout
Banjhakri Falls is a natural waterfall sourced from springs at higher elevation. The theme park was conceived by Chief Minister of Sikkim Pawan Kumar Chamling, who had visited the falls during his visit to the Ranka Monastery on 28 September 2004. He intended to revive interest in the traditional shamanic beliefs of the people. Citizens were invited to suggest themes for the park. The park was consequently developed into an attraction that celebrated the shamanic traditions of the people of Sikkim.

Among the park's attractions are a man-made lake with a dragon in the centre; gazebos; statues of jhākri; and statues of the ancestors of the Lyam Lymay, Mangpas, and Lepcha peoples of Sikkim. Sculptures of jhākri, Bongthing, Phedangba, and Bijuwa are housed in thatched enclosures. Paved paths and footbridges wind through the landscaped garden, which is decorated with ornamental trees and flowers, such as ardesia, acer, poinsettia (Euphorbia pulcherrima), camellia, angelica, hydrangea, and tebuchinie.

Gazebos have been erected throughout the park. A museum hall curated by the Sikkim Rural Energy Development Agency (SREDA) has exhibits about renewable energy. The grounds also feature exhibits about topics in renewal energy, such as solar water heaters, solar-powered cars, energy drums, et al. The park is lit by solar-powered lamps.

References

Waterfalls of Sikkim
Parks in India
Plunge waterfalls
Protected areas of Sikkim
Gangtok
Protected areas with year of establishment missing